The North London Hard Courts Championships  was a combined men's and women's clay court tennis tournament founded in 1920. The tournament was co held at the Gipsy Lawn Tennis Club, Stamford Hill, and the North London Hard Courts Tennis Club, Highbury London, England It ran until 1939.

History
The North London Hard Courts Championships were established in 1920. The championships were usually held in early autumn in September each year. However their were two events of the womens championships in 1922 and 1923 the first in the spring in May, and a second in September. The tournament was co held at the Gipsy Lawn Tennis Club, Stamford Hill and North London Hard Courts Tennis Club, Highbury London, England It ran until 193 when it was abolished.

Notbale winners of the men's singles title included; Athar Ali Fyzee, Nicolae Mishu, Antoine Gentien, Major Ritchie, Pat Spence, René Lacoste, Gordon Lowe, and Henry Mayes. Winners of the women's singles championship included; Ermyntrude Harvey, Dorothy Holman, Helen Wills-Moody, Lili de Alvarez  and Sylvie Jung Henrotin.

Venues
The Gipsy Lawn Tennis Club was founded in 1920 at Stamford Hill, London. It consisted of seven hard (clay) and twelve grass courts. The club also staged the North London Grass Courts Championships. The North London Hard Courts Lawn Tennis Club at Sotheby Road, Highbury,  was the other venue used for this event.

Additional notes
Newspaper sources list the tournament as being held in Highbury, however Mullock's Specialist Auctioneers & Valuers of London state on their website that the tournament was staged continuously at the Gipsy Lawn Tennis Club Stamford Hill.

See also
 North London Championships

References

Defunct tennis tournaments in the United Kingdom
Clay court tennis tournaments